Maureen Brunt  (26 December 1928 – 30 January 2019) was an Australian economist and academic who specialised in the field of competition law. She was Emeritus professor of Economics at Monash University.

Early life and education
Brunt received a degree in economics from the University of Melbourne in 1951 and a Doctor of Philosophy in industrial organization from Harvard University in 1964.

Career
Brunt was a lecturer in economics at the University of Melbourne, the University of Adelaide, and Harvard University in the 1960s. She returned to Australia in 1996 to become Professor of Economics at Monash University, becoming the first woman to hold a Chair of Economics in Australia. She is known for her "innovative analysis of the interaction of ... law and economics". She was described by the Privy Council as "a distinguished Australian economist."

Brunt was a member and then Chair of the Victorian Government Consumer Affairs Council, serving for nearly ten years. During her tenure as chair, the council delivered its inquiry into deceptive trade practices law in Victoria.

Brunt was a foundation member of the Australian Trade Practices Tribunal. She was a lay member of the High Court of New Zealand for competition cases from 1990 until 2000.

She died on 30 January 2019, aged 90.

Awards and honours
Brunt was named an officer of the Order of Australia in the Australia Day Honours in 1992 for "services to the Trade Practices Tribunal and to education." In 1995, she was awarded an honorary Doctor of Laws from Monash University. She was elected a distinguished fellow of the Economics Society of Australia in 2006.

Selected publications

Books

Chapters

Journal articles

References

1928 births
2019 deaths
Australian women economists
Australian economists
Academic staff of Monash University
University of Melbourne alumni
Harvard University alumni
Academic staff of the University of Adelaide
Officers of the Order of Australia
Harvard University faculty
University of Melbourne women
Australian expatriates in the United States